The 2018–19 East of Scotland Football League (known as the Central Taxis East of Scotland League for sponsorship reasons) was the 90th season of the East of Scotland Football League, and the 5th season as the sixth tier of the Scottish football pyramid system. The season began on 11 August 2018 and ended on 18 May 2019. Kelty Hearts were the reigning champions but could not defend their title after being promoted to the Lowland Football League.

The league saw an increase from 13 to 39 teams and was split into three parallel conferences, each containing 13 teams. The additional teams consisted of 24 clubs who applied to switch from the SJFA East Region, one from the SJFA West Region, one new team and Hawick Royal Albert who were relegated from the Lowland League.

The winners of each conference took part in a round-robin competition at the end of the season, with Bonnyrigg Rose Athletic being crowned league champions on 4 May 2019 after winning both their championship play-off matches. They later clinched promotion to the Lowland League after gaining their SFA licence on 14 June 2019.

The top five clubs in each conference, and best 6th-placed, formed the new 16-team Premier Division for the 2019–20 season.

Teams
The following teams changed division after the 2017–18 season.

To East of Scotland Football League
Relegated from Lowland Football League
 Hawick Royal Albert
Transferred from East Superleague
 Bo'ness United
 Bonnyrigg Rose Athletic
 Broxburn Athletic
 Camelon Juniors
 Dundonald Bluebell
 Hill of Beath Hawthorn
 Jeanfield Swifts
 Linlithgow Rose
 Newtongrange Star
 Penicuik Athletic
 Sauchie Juniors
Transferred from East Premier League
 Arniston Rangers
 Blackburn United
 Dalkeith Thistle
 Dunbar United
 Haddington Athletic
 Musselburgh Athletic
 St Andrews United
 Tranent Juniors
Transferred from East South Division
 Craigroyston
 Crossgates Primrose
 Easthouses Lily MW
 Edinburgh United
 Oakley United
Transferred from West Central District Second Division
Dunipace

Inverkeithing Hillfield Swifts also joined having previously played in the Fife Amateur Football League.

From East of Scotland Football League
Promoted to Lowland League
 Kelty Hearts

Conference A

Teams and locations

League table

Results

Conference B

Teams and locations

League table

Results

Conference C

Teams and locations

League table

Results

Championship play-off
At the end of the season, the three conference winners took part in a three match round-robin competition to determine the league champion, and subject to meeting the required licensing criteria, promotion to the Lowland League. Bonnyrigg Rose Athletic were crowned champions after winning both of their matches, and later gained promotion having eventually received their SFA licence on 14 June 2019.

Notes
 Club has an SFA Licence (as of March 2019) and are eligible for promotion to the Lowland League should they win the championship play-off.

References

6
 
Sco